Malvinas Argentinas Partido is a partido (county) in Buenos Aires Province, Argentina.

Malvinas Argentinas may also refer to:

 Malvinas Argentinas, Córdoba, a town in Córdoba Province, Argentina
 Estadio Malvinas Argentinas, a stadium in the city of Mendoza, Argentina
 Ushuaia – Malvinas Argentinas International Airport, Ushuaia, Argentina
 Falkland Islands sovereignty dispute, a territorial dispute between Argentina and the United Kingdom

See also

 Malvinas (disambiguation)
 Malvina (disambiguation)
 
 
 Falklands (disambiguation)